The Biranchi Narayan Sun Temple, also known as the Abode of Viranchinarayana or the Wooden Konark, is a Hindu Temple located in the town of Buguda in Ganjam, Odisha. It is the second Surya temple constructed in Odisha, after the famous Konark Sun Temple.

Construction
The temple was renovated by King Srikara Bhanjadeva in 1790. The presiding deity at the temple is Biranchi Narayan or Surya in the combination of Hindu trinity , whose image was recovered from ruins at Maltigad. The imagery also features a chariot driven by seven horses with one wheel on its left side, with Aruṇa as the chariot's driver.

The roof of the temple is constructed on a total of 46 pillars and contains intricate wood designs. Unlike the Konark temple, which faces east, the Birachi Narayan Sun Temple faces west. Consequently, while at Konark sun rays of the rising sun shine on the installed Surya, at the Biranchi Narayan Temple the rays of the setting sun fall on Surya's feet.

Wooden Konark
As per the desire of the king, the main God icon of the temple is made in wood. According to a legend, the stone image of the Surya is constructed off the main wooden image of Lord Surya.

Festivals
Ratha Saptami, during the month of Maagha
Samba Dashami, during the month of Pausha
Every Sunday, Sankranti.

References

External links
Buguda temple at India9.com
Images of Biranchi Narayan at Indira Gandhi National Centre for the Arts

Surya temples
Hindu temples in Ganjam district
18th-century Hindu temples